Kalisindh Thermal Power Station is located 12 km away from Jhalawar town in Jhalawar district, Rajasthan state in western India. The power plant is operated by Rajasthan Rajya Vidyut Utpadan Nigam Ltd (RVUNL).

Water for the plant is provided by the Kalisindh Dam reservoir, near Bhanwarasi village. Coal for the plant will be sourced from Paras east and Kanta basin coal blocks in Chhattisgarh state.

Its chimney has a height of 275 metres. The two cooling towers of the facility are 202 metres tall, the tallest in the world. The EPC contractor for the project is BGR Energy Systems Ltd.

Installed capacity
Following is the unitary capacity of the plant.

See also 

 List of tallest cooling towers

References

External links 
 https://web.archive.org/web/20140403124637/http://www.rvunl.com/Kalisindh%20Thermal%20Power%20Project.php

Coal-fired power stations in Rajasthan
Jhalawar district
Buildings and structures in Kota, Rajasthan
2014 establishments in Rajasthan
Energy infrastructure completed in 2014